Joseph Albert Florimond "Battleship" Leduc (November 22, 1902 – July 31, 1990) was a Canadian professional ice hockey defenceman. He played in the National Hockey League from 1925 to 1935. with the New York Rangers, Ottawa Senators, and Montreal Canadiens. He won Stanley Cup twice, in 1930, and 1931, both with Montreal.

Career
Leduc played in the National Hockey League (NHL) from 1925 to 1935. During this period, he played for the New York Rangers, the Ottawa Senators and the Montreal Canadiens. He was part of the two Montreal Canadiens teams to win the Stanley Cup in 1930 and 1931.

Leduc played amateur hockey with the Collège de Valleyfield team.

Personal 
Leduc's grand nephew, Philippe Hudon, is an ice hockey player who was drafted by the Detroit Red Wings in the 5th round of the 2011 NHL Entry Draft.

Career statistics

Regular season and playoffs

References

External links
 
 Montreal Canadiens Biography.

1902 births
1990 deaths
Canadian ice hockey defencemen
Ice hockey people from Quebec
Montreal Canadiens players
New York Rangers players
Ottawa Senators (1917) players
Providence Reds players
Quebec Castors players
Sportspeople from Salaberry-de-Valleyfield
Stanley Cup champions